Asche may refer to:

 Asche (surname)
 Asché, a code name of Hans-Thilo Schmidt (1888–1943), German cryptographer who sold information about the Enigma coding machine to the French
 Asche (band), a German musical project

See also
 Asch (disambiguation)